An aristeia or aristia ("excellence") is a scene in the dramatic conventions of epic poetry as in the Iliad, where a hero in battle has his finest moments (aristos = "best"). Aristeia may result in the death of the hero, and therefore suggests a "battle in which he reaches his peak as a fighter and hero".

Historical background
In the pre-hoplite phase of Greek military evolution, the well-armed aristocrat was the major focus of military action, placed at the apex of his less well-armed dependants. This was reflected in the Homeric division between nobility and commoners, and in the regular epic struggles over the armour of the former, once fallen in their aristeia.

Classical hoplite armies, though very different, nevertheless still awarded prizes (aristeia) for individual excellence in action.

Epic examples
Literally, "moment of excellence", aristeiai often coincide with battleground slaughter, and feature one warrior who dominates the battle. 

Aristeiai abound in Homer's Iliad, the peak being Achilles' aristeia in Books 20–22 where he almost single-handedly routs the Trojan army and then goes on to kill its champion Hector. Achilles' "extended and phenomenal solo performances in battle" are shown in the epic's "longest and most murderous" series of events. Other instances of this phenomenon in the Iliad are found in Diomedes' "preeminent deeds" in battle while empowered by Athena (Books 5 and 6, the longest after Achilles' from Book 20–22), Hector's leading of the Trojan assault on the Achaian camp in Book 8 (with the help of Zeus), Agamemnon's aristeia in Book 11 where his rampage prompts Zeus to warn Hector against meeting him in battle, as well as Patroclus' aristeia in Book 16, which ultimately leads to his demise at the hands of Hector. Book 16 illustrates how aristeiai often fit into the "epic overextension" of battles: the arming of the warriors, the march into battle, the initial clash, the intense exchanges, and the retreat of one of the armies—often leading to a hero's opportunity for his aristeia.

In Book 22 of the Odyssey, Greek hero Odysseus slaughters all of the suitors in his palace in another homeric display of martial excellence. Aristeia also suggests the qualities of the hero that make his great deeds possible, such as Odysseus' polymetis ("cunning intelligence") that allows him to triumph over the Cyclops Polyphemus in Book 9 of the Odyssey.

Aristeia is also seen, to some extent, in the Aeneid, when Nisus and Euryalus leave the Trojan defences in Book 9 to slaughter the Latin captains while they sleep. It also features in Book 10, when Mezentius takes the place of Turnus and strikes down all in his path: it draws upon Homeric models, using a simile. Camilla also has an aristeia in Book 11 killing twelve opponents, but ends with her death.

In Paradise Lost, Books V and VI see the most individual moments of battlefield domination (aristeia), associated with (for example) the figure of Abdiel.

Recent examples
In the film 300, individual Spartan deaths are often portrayed as a Homeric aristeia.

See also
Arete (excellence)

References

External links
 Aristeia A comic-strip explanation of the formula of an Aristeia by Greek Myth Comix
 Arming formula A comic-strip explanation of the arming sequence that tales place at the beginning of an Aristeia by Greek Myth Comix

Ancient Greek theatre
Narratology